Gladden may mean to bring happiness or to become happier. It may also refer to:

Places in the United States
 Gladden, Missouri, an unincorporated community
 Gladden Farm, a historic home and farm complex in Maryland
 Gladden Windmill, a historic windmill in Napoli, New York

Other uses
 Gladden (name)
 Gladden (Middle-earth), a fictional Middle-earth river

See also
 Carrack Gladden, coastal headland in St Ives Bay just north of the Hayle Estuary, in Cornwall
 Gladden Fields, a fictional location in J. R. R. Tolkien's Middle-earth